The 1975–76 FIBA European Champions Cup was the 19th edition of the European top-tier level professional basketball club competition FIBA European Champions Cup (now called EuroLeague). The Final was held at the Patinoire des Vernets, in Geneva, Switzerland, on April 1, 1976. In a third consecutive final for these two teams, Mobilgirgi Varese defeated Real Madrid, by a result of 81–74.

Competition system
23 teams. European national domestic league champions, plus the then current FIBA European Champions Cup title holders only, playing in a tournament system. The Final was a single game, played on a neutral court.

First round

|}

Second round

|}

*While they were eligible as the national champions to do so, ÍR never intended to participate in the tournament due to high costs involved and thus didn't register for it nor pay the participation fees. A letter by the Icelandic Basketball Association which informed FIBA on which Icelandic teams where eligible to participate in official FIBA tournaments was mistakenly taken as a confirmation of their participation.  Due to the mistake, Real Madrid went through with a walkover.

Automatically qualified to the group stage
 Mobilgirgi Varese (title holder)
 Zadar
 ASVEL
 Maes Pils
 Maccabi Elite Tel Aviv

Quarterfinals group stage
The quarterfinals were played with a round-robin system, in which every Two Game series (TGS) constituted as one game for the record.

Semifinals

Final
April 1, Patinoire des Vernets, Geneva

|}

Awards

FIBA European Champions Cup Finals Top Scorer
 Bob Morse ( Ignis Varese)

References

External links
1975–76 FIBA European Champions Cup
 1975–76 FIBA European Champions Cup
 Champions Cup 1975–76 Line-ups and Stats

EuroLeague seasons
FIBA